David Nagel is an American manager. He held executive positions in a wide variety of technology companies and organizations.

Career 
From 1972 to 1988, Nagel was at NASA, culminating as head of human factors research. He was co-editor of the 1988 book Human Factors in Aviation. He then joined Apple, where he was senior vice president leading the worldwide research and development group responsible for Mac OS software, especially the Copland project, Macintosh hardware, imaging and other peripheral products development. He resigned from Apple and joined AT&T in April, 1996, staying there for five years. Nagel was the chief technology officer at AT&T and president of AT&T Labs. In 2001, he joined Palm, first as a member of the Palm Board of Directors and then as the first CEO of PalmSource. Since 2005 he has remained active in the technology industry as a director of several companies and as a venture capital investor.

Memberships
Member, National Research Council Study Group on IT R&D Infrastructure
Member, Board of Directors, Liberate, Inc.
Member, Board of Directors, Arcsoft
Member, Board of Trustees, UCLA Foundation
Emeritus Member, Board of the Tech Museum in San Jose, California
Member, President Clinton's first Advisory Committee on High Performance Computing, Communication, and the Next Generation Internet, 1997
Member, Federal Communications Commission's Technological Advisory Council, 1999

References

External links
 
 

Year of birth missing (living people)
Living people
University of California, Los Angeles alumni
Apple Inc. executives
Businesspeople in software
Place of birth missing (living people)
American technology chief executives
American chief technology officers
UCLA Henry Samueli School of Engineering and Applied Science alumni